The 13th Dáil was elected at the 1948 general election on 4 February 1948 and first met on 18 February 1948. The members of Dáil Éireann, the house of representatives of the Oireachtas (legislature), of Ireland are known as TDs. The 13th Dáil was dissolved by President Seán T. O'Kelly on 7 May 1951, at the request of the Taoiseach John A. Costello. The 13th Dáil lasted  days.

Composition of the 13th Dáil

Government coalition parties denoted with bullets

Graphical representation
This is a graphical comparison of party strengths in the 13th Dáil from February 1948. This was not the official seating plan.

Ceann Comhairle
On the meeting of the Dáil, Frank Fahy (FF) was proposed as Ceann Comhairle by Éamon de Valera (FF) and seconded by Richard Mulcahy (FG). His election was approved unanimously.

TDs by constituency
The list of the 147 TDs elected, is given in alphabetical order by Dáil constituency.

Changes

See also
 Members of the 6th Seanad

References

External links
Houses of the Oireachtas: Debates: 13th Dáil

 
13
13th Dáil